The Armenian Evangelical Secondary School of Anjar was founded by Swiss Missionaries in 1947. It has a dormitory for boys and girls.

The present principal is Rev. Hagop Akbasharian.

History
Soon after the Armenian people of Musa Dagh were settled in the village of Anjar located in the Bekaa Valley, Lebanon in 1939, the Armenian Evangelical School (elementary section) started to operate in the newly constructed church building. In 1947, at the peak of Second World War and while Anjarians refugees were suffering during these hard times, the school gave its first graduates from the elementary section. 
In 1947, Sister Hedwig Aienshanslin, member of the Swiss-German Hilfsbund Mission, arrived in Anjar and started the missionary work in a single room. In 1948, she was asked to assume the responsibility of running the school. Soon the elementary school became a junior high school. In 1955, the boarding department was established with 15 students from Kessab, Beirut and Zahleh. Two other sisters Mary Rock and Anna Nitsche joined sister Hedwig.

See also
Armenian Evangelical School of Trad (Trad, Lebanon)
Armenian Evangelical Peter and Elizabeth Torosian School (Amanos, Lebanon)
Armenian Evangelical Shamlian Tatigian Secondary School (Bourj Hammoud, Lebanon)
Armenian Evangelical Central High School (Ashrafieh, Lebanon)
Yeprem and Martha Philibosian Armenian Evangelical College (Beirut, Lebanon)
Armenian Evangelical Guertmenian School (Ashrafieh, Lebanon)
Haigazian University (Riad El Solh, Beirut, Lebanon)

External links
The Alumni Association of the Armenian Evangelical Secondary School of Anjar
Educational Council of the Union of the Armenian Evangelical Churches in the Near East (UAECNE)

Schools in Lebanon
Armenian Evangelical schools
Educational institutions established in 1947
1947 establishments in Lebanon